is a town located in Saitama Prefecture, Japan. , the town had an estimated population of 19,653 in 8105 households and a population density of 470 persons per km2.

Geography
Kawajima is located in the Arakawa River drainage basis in central Saitama Prefecture.

Surrounding municipalities
Saitama Prefecture
 Kawagoe
 Higshimatsuyama
 Ageo
 Okegawa
 Kitamoto
 Sakado
 Yoshimi

Climate
Kawajima has a humid subtropical climate (Köppen Cfa) characterized by warm summers and cool winters with light to no snowfall.  The average annual temperature in Kawajima is 14.4 °C. The average annual rainfall is 1448 mm with September as the wettest month. The temperatures are highest on average in August, at around 26.3 °C, and lowest in January, at around 3.0 °C.

Demographics
Per Japanese census data, the population of Kawajima peaked around the year 2000 and has declined since.

History
The village of Kawajima was created on November 3, 1954 by the merger of the villages of Nakamura, Igusa, Mionoya, Demaru, Yatsuho, and Omino. It was elevated to town status on November 3, 1972.

Government
Kawajima has a mayor-council form of government with a directly elected mayor and a unicameral town council of 14 members. Kawajima, together with the city of Higashimatsuyama and the town of Yoshimi, contributes two members to the Saitama Prefectural Assembly. In terms of national politics, the town is part of Saitama 10th district of the lower house of the Diet of Japan.

Economy
Honda has an assembly plant in Kawajima, which is a major local employer.

Education
Kawajima has four public elementary schools and two public middle schools operated by the town government. The town does not have a high school. The Saitama Prefectural Board of Education operates one special education school for the handicapped.

Transportation

Railway
Kawajima does not have any passenger rail service

Highway

Airports
Honda Airport

Noted people from Kawajima
Taimei Yamaguchi, politician

References

External links

Official Website 

Towns in Saitama Prefecture
Hiki District, Saitama
Kawajima, Saitama